The Politburo was the leading organ of the Party of Labour of Albania. It comprised key government ministers and Central Committee secretaries and served as the main administrative and policy-making body, convening on a weekly basis.

The following is the composition of the Politburo that would be formed after every Congress of the Party. The politburo for the 1941–48 period is not included.

Politburo members 

Generally, the Central Committee approved Politburo reports and policy decisions. The Secretariat was responsible for guiding the day-to-day affairs of the Party, in particular for organising the execution of Politburo decisions and for selecting Party and government cadres.

See also
Politburo
Enver Hoxha
Party of Labour of Albania
Eastern Bloc politics

References

Politics of Albania
Political organizations based in Albania
Politburos
Government agencies established in 1948
People's Socialist Republic of Albania
Labour Party of Albania